Yud may refer to:
Yodh or Yud, the tenth letter of many Semitic alphabets
YUD, the IATA airport code for Umiujaq Airport in Quebec, Canada
YUD, the ISO 4217 three letter code for the Yugoslavian dinar

See also
Yud-Alef Stadium, a football stadium in Ashdod, Israel